This is an alphabetical list of notable bhangra bands and solo artists.

Abrar-ul-Haq
Achanak
Alaap
Aman Hayer
Amar Arshi
Apna Sangeet
B21
Bally Sagoo
Bhujhangy Group
Bombay Talkie
Bombay Rockers
Chirag Pehchan
Daler Mehndi
Diljit Dosanjh 
DCS
Dr Zeus
Dhol Foundation, The
Gippy Grewal
Gurdas Maan
Heera
Harbhajan Mann
Imran Khan
Intermix
Josh
Jasmine Sandlas
Jazzy B
Juggy D
Kulwinder Dhillon
Lehmber Hussainpuri
Malkit Singh
Ms Scandalous
Panjabi MC
RDB
Rishi Rich
Sahotas
Sardool Sikander
Sukhbir
Sukshinder Shinda
Swami
Tigerstyle
Yo Yo Honey Singh
Zack Knight

References

Bhangra (music) musical groups
Bhangra